East Coast Railway Stadium is a cricket stadium in Bhubaneswar, Odisha. It hosts Ranji Trophy, and other matches.

History

The present stadium was built across an area of over 22 acres at a cost of Rs 6 crore. The stadium has four turfs for practice. The drainage system is one of the best in the state. The stadium hosted its first Ranji Trophy match in November 2008.

A few Twenty20 matches during the first edition of the Odisha Premier League were also hosted at this venue.

A huge manual scoreboard has been put up for the first time for Odisha versus Karnataka Ranji Trophy match.

In 2010, Bhubaneswar Stadium was put to use during the Orissa-Punjab Elite Group B Ranji Trophy tournament league match was played. General Manager of East Coast Railway AK Vohra inaugurated the match. Former Australian cricketer and Odisha coach Michael Bevan was also present.

References

External links
Cricinfo
Cricket Archive

Cricket grounds in Bhubaneswar
Sports venues completed in 2008
2008 establishments in Orissa
Cricket grounds in Odisha